The Motolite Volleyball Team is the professional women's volleyball team playing in the Premier Volleyball League. The team is owned by Philippine Batteries Inc. and named after its subsidiary, Motolite Batteries.

History 
The team debuted in the Premier Volleyball League in 2018 Premier Volleyball League Open Conference with the Ateneo Lady Eagles Volleyball Team core mentored by Coach Oliver Almadro. In 2019, the team had a new set of players headed by Myla Pablo.

Motolite decided to take a leave of absence from the PVL for the 2021 season due to the COVID-19 pandemic.

Name changes 
 Ateneo – Motolite Lady Eagles (2018)
 Motolite Volleyball (2019)

Current roster 

Technical Staff

 Team Captain
 Import
 Draft Pick
 Rookie
 Inactive
 Suspended
 Free Agent
 Injured

Previous roster 

Technical Staff

 Team Captain
 Import
 Draft Pick
 Rookie
 Inactive
 Suspended
 Free Agent
 Injured

Technical Staff

 Team Captain
 Import
 Draft Pick
 Rookie
 Inactive
 Suspended
 Free Agent
 Injured

Coaching Staff 
 Head coach:
  Oliver Allan Almadro
 Assistant coaches:
  Jarod Hubalde
  Vincent Raphael Mangulabnan 
  Karlo Martin Santos
 Strength & Conditioning Coach: 
  Angelino Martini de Leon

Team staff
 Team manager:
  Renchi Vera Cruz
 Asst. team manager: 
  Ramona Jessica Bagatsing
 Student managers: 
 
 Team Utility:

Medical Staff
 Team Physician: 
 Team Physical Therapist:
 Bethel Solano

Honors

Team

Individual

Transactions 

2021 Open Conference:

2019 Reinforced Conference:

2019 Open Conference:

Team captains 
  Isabel Beatriz De Leon (2018)
  Myla Pablo (2019)
  Iris Tolenada (2019)

Imports

Coaches 
  Oliver Allan Almadro (2018 Open)
  Airess Padda (2019 Reinforced)
  Godfrey Okumu (2019 Open)

Former players 

Local players

 Danielle Theris Ravena
 Ma. Deanna Izabella Wong
 Julianne Marie Samonte
 Vanessa Gandler
 Janel Maraguinot
 Madeleine Yrenea Madayag
 Isabela Margarita Peralta
 Pauline Marie Monique Gaston
 Katrina Mae Tolentino
 Erika Beatriz Raagas
 Isabel Beatriz De Leon
 Kassandra Miren Gequillana
 Samantha Ellen Fanger
 Jaycel Ann Delos Reyes
 Aieshalaine Gannaban
 Maristella Gene Layug

Foreign players

 Edina Selimovic

 Channon Thompson
 Krystle Esdelle

Notes 
  - Bosnian import Edina Selimovic was replaced by Krystle Esdelle due to an injury.

References 

2018 establishments in the Philippines
Volleyball clubs established in 2018
Women's volleyball teams in the Philippines